Kokey may refer to:

 Kokey (film), a 1997 Philippine film
 Kokey (TV series), a 2007 Philippine television series
 Kokey at Ako, a 2010 Philippine television series, sequel to Kokey
 Kokey, Benin

See also
 Koke (disambiguation)